Shaheen Sehbai is a Pakistani-American journalist and former Group Editor of daily English newspaper The News International.

Career 

Shaheen Sehbai resigned from The News International in March 2002 after receiving a memorandum from his publisher admonishing him for publicishing libelous material, alienating advertisers, and generally avoiding senior government officials as well his own staff, among other complaints; Mr. Sehbai claimed that the criticism was because he failed to support the Musharraf government. In August 2002, the Committee to Protect Journalists sent a public letter to then-President Pervez Musharraf to draw his attention to alleged harassment of Shaheen Sehbai's family.

In July 2010, Shaheen Sehbai filed a defamation notice against Azeem Daultana, a member of the National Assembly of Pakistan and two newspapers for publishing a column written by Daultana. The notice complains that the column alleges that Sehbai has undertaken a "revenge mission" against the present President Asif Ali Zardari because Sehbai had been "denied" an Ambassadorship, a claim that was originally made in an Aftab Iqbal column published in Nawa-i-Waqt on December 29, 2008.

In April 2016, Shaheen Sehbai resigned from The News International citing concerns about the newspaper's political leaning and claiming that the paper "unnecessarily engaged in a dangerous conflict with national institutions."

References

External links
Interview with Shaheen Sehbai

Pakistani male journalists
Pakistani people of Gujarati descent
Living people
American male journalists
American writers of Pakistani descent
Pakistani emigrants to the United States
American people of Gujarati descent
Year of birth missing (living people)